Coastline Community College is a public community college with three mini-campuses in Westminster, Garden Grove, and Newport Beach and an administration building in Fountain Valley, California. The college offers Associate in Arts degrees, Associate in Science degrees, courses to prepare students to transfer to a four-year college or university, and career and technical courses that can lead to career advancement and/or an occupational certificate. The college was founded in 1976 and is part of the Coast Community College District and the California Community Colleges.

History
The school was originally started by the Coast Community College District as the distance learning college; it served the DL needs of Coast District residents, while Orange Coast College and Golden West College served many of the on-campus needs, with Coastline also using community facilities for site classes. Coastline has now evolved to include a distance learning program as well as on-campus classes available at its three mini-campus sites and other physical locations throughout the district.

Campus locations
Coastline Community College's administration offices are located in a 40,000 sq.ft., administration facility located at 11460 Warner Avenue, Fountain Valley California, 92708.

Unlike most colleges, Coastline does not have a traditional campus. Instead, instruction is offered at sites throughout the Coast Community College District. The college has three main mini-campuses based in Newport Beach, Garden Grove and Westminster, with an administration building (offering enrollment services, counseling, a bookstore, and more) in Fountain Valley. The Westminster Center is formally called the "Le-Jao Center" in honor of the Le family (owners of Lee's Sandwiches) and the Jao family (owners of the Asian Garden Mall and Bridgecreek Development), who contributed substantially to the Coastline Foundation's endowment.

In fall 2012, the college opened a new campus at 1515 Monrovia in Newport Beach. This is home to several general education courses and programs, including the college's Paralegal Program, Acquired Brain Injury, Intellectual Disabilities and COAST Vocational Programs,  Special Programs Department, Art Department, and Digital Art. It is also home to a Veterans Resource Center and the Coastline Art Gallery, a community art gallery that is open to the public.

Academics
Students can take courses to fulfill their general education transfer requirements, or explore vocational programs like biotechnology and informatics. Coastline also offers an English as a Second Language (ESL) program and a unique Acquired Brain Injury (ABI) program.

College offerings include:
 General education programs for preparation/transfer to a four-year university
 Associate in Arts and Associate in Science degrees in a variety of majors
 Career and technical education courses and certificates
 Hundreds of online classes and complete online degree programs
 Acquired Brain Injury (ABI) program (for those with brain injury due to traumatic or non-traumatic accident or event)
 Educational programs for members of the U.S. military 
 Educational programs for inmates at FCI Terminal Island

References

External links

California Community Colleges
Universities and colleges in Orange County, California
Distance education institutions based in the United States
Two-year colleges in the United States
Fountain Valley, California
Education in Garden Grove, California
Newport Beach, California
Westminster, California
Schools accredited by the Western Association of Schools and Colleges
Educational institutions established in 1976
1976 establishments in California